Al Clark (February 29, 1948 – June 4, 2004) was an American football defensive back who played six seasons in the National Football League with the Detroit Lions, the Los Angeles Rams, and the Philadelphia Eagles.

Early life
Clark was born in Bogalusa, Louisiana and attended Greenville Park High School in Hammond. He enrolled and played college football at Grambling State University before transferring to Northern Arizona University and lastly Eastern Michigan University.

Professional career
Clark was drafted by the Detroit Lions in the third round of the 1971 NFL Draft, 72nd overall. After one year with the Lions as a cornerback and kick returner, Clark signed with the Rams, where he stayed for four years. His final year was with the Eagles in 1976.

On December 10, 1972, Clark was on the field when St. Louis Cardinals' quarterback Jim Hart completed a pass to Bobby Moore (later known as Ahmad Rashad), who caught the ball on the run near his own 40-yard line.  After Gene Howard, Jim Nettles, Marlin McKeever, and Dave Elmendorf missed tackles, Clark brought down Moore on the Rams' one-yard line, making it the longest non-scoring pass play in National Football League history.

Clark was a stellar special teams players for the Rams, making many big plays with blocked kicks and speed on the defensive side of the ball in the Los Angeles Coliseum. Made Rams jersey #44 a threat on the field and bolstered the Rams special teams and defense.

Later life
Clark died June 4, 2004, of undisclosed causes.

References

External links
Just Sports Stats

2004 deaths
1948 births
Players of American football from Louisiana
American football defensive backs
African-American players of American football
Grambling State Tigers football players
Northern Arizona Lumberjacks football players
Eastern Michigan Eagles football players
Detroit Lions players
Los Angeles Rams players
Philadelphia Eagles players
People from Bogalusa, Louisiana
20th-century African-American sportspeople
21st-century African-American people